Jasper Yeates House, also known as the home of WRKY Radio, is a historic home located at Lancaster, Lancaster County, Pennsylvania. It was built in 1765–1766, and is a four-story, four bay brick townhouse, in the Georgian style. In 1882, it was expanded to add the fourth floor and converted to commercial uses. It was restored in 1978–1979. It was the home of prominent Pennsylvania lawyer and justice Jasper Yeates (1745–1817) from 1775 to 1817.

It was listed on the National Register of Historic Places in 1982.

References

Houses on the National Register of Historic Places in Pennsylvania
Georgian architecture in Pennsylvania
Houses completed in 1766
Houses in Lancaster, Pennsylvania
National Register of Historic Places in Lancaster, Pennsylvania